Howard's Adventure is a historic slave plantation located in Gambrills, Maryland in Anne Arundel County. The historic estate was a starting point for the prominent Hammond Family of the region. The House was built by Charles Hammond after 1710. It was the home of Matthias Hammond, builder of the Hammond–Harwood House, and Colonel Rezin Hammond, builder of Burleigh Manor. The house remnants and Hammond Graveyard now site within the U.S. Naval Academy farm complex.

References

External links
Howard's Adventure Matthias Hammond's Country Estate

Houses completed in the 18th century
Buildings and structures in Annapolis, Maryland
Houses in Anne Arundel County, Maryland